Hannelore Hradez (born 30 December 1940) is an Austrian fencer. She competed in the women's individual and team foil events at the 1972 Summer Olympics.

References 

1940 births
Living people
Austrian female foil fencers
Olympic fencers of Austria
Fencers at the 1972 Summer Olympics